The 2006 European Weightlifting Championships were held in Władysławowo, Poland from 29 April to 7 May 2006. It was the 85th edition of the event, which was first staged in 1896.

Medal overview

Men

Women

Medal table

References
Results  (European Weightlifting Federation)

E
Weightlifting
European Weightlifting Championships
Sport in Pomeranian Voivodeship
International weightlifting competitions hosted by Poland